The 1930 Catholic University Cardinals football team was an American football team that represented the Catholic University of America as an independent during the 1930 college football season. In its first year under head coach Dutch Bergman, the team compiled a 1–8 record and was outscored by a total of 181 to 115.

Schedule

References

Catholic University
Catholic University Cardinals football seasons
Catholic University Cardinals football